Matouš the Cobbler (Czech: O ševci Matoušovi) is a 1948 Czechoslovak drama film, directed by Miroslav Cikán. It stars  Ladislav Pešek, Vladimír Řepa, Jaroslav Průcha, and Josef Kemr.

References

External links
Matouš the Cobbler (O ševci Matoušovi) at the Internet Movie Database

1948 films
Czechoslovak drama films
1940s Czech-language films
1948 drama films
Films directed by Miroslav Cikán
Czechoslovak black-and-white films
1940s Czech films